Corsica Ferries - Sardinia Ferries (Corsica Ferries France SAS – Forship SpA) is a Franco-Italian ferry company that operates traffic to and from the islands of Corsica, Sardinia and Elba.

The ferry company was founded in 1967 by the Corsican Pascal Lota under the name of Corsica Line with one ferry, the Corsica Express. Since the company’s humble beginnings it has continuously grown and is today the market leader to Corsica and Sardinia. 

Corsica Sardinia Ferries is the premier ferry operator on the Western Mediterranean Sea transporting more than 2.8 million passengers annually aboard their ferries running to and from France and Italy to Corsica, Sardinia and Elba.

Corsica Sardinia Ferries operate two return routes from Italy to Sardinia and 10 return routes from France and Italy to Corsica, with a total of up to 13 crossings daily.

The fleet currently consists of 14 vessels. Thanks to its no-frills economical model, the company today holds a market share of 68,7% of the maritime traffic to Corsica (2017).

In 2005, Forship Spa, a subsidiary of Corsica Sardinia Ferries, has been condemned to pay 490 000 euros by the Tribunal of Marseille for having "voluntary discharged at sea" offshore of the Cap Corse on May 12, 2004.

Current fleet

Former fleet 
 Corsica Ferry (1972–1976) Scrapped as Azzura II in Aliaga, Turkey in 2011.
 Corsica Star (1973–1980) Sank as Jassim in Wingate Reef in 2003.
 Corsica Serena (1975–1981) Scrapped in Gadani Beach, Pakistan in 2003.
 Corsica Nova (1976–1988) Scrapped in Aliaga, Turkey in 2011.
 Corsica Marina (1977–1990) Scrapped in Aliaga, Turkey in 2013.
 A. Regina (1979–1985) Scrapped in 1989.
 Corsica Viva (1980–1985) Scrapped in Aliaga, Turkey in 2004.
 Sardinia Nova (1982–2006) Scrapped as Atlas Han in Iskenderun, Turkey in 2015.
 Corsica Regina (1989–2021) as Kevalay Queen since 2021.
 Elba Nova (1992–1998) as Lady Carmela since 2019.
 Sardinia Viva (1980–1994) Scrapped as Derin Deniz in Alang, India in 2004.
 Corsica Express (1995–1997) as New Mikasa since 2021.
 Corsica Express Seconda (1996–2015) as Paros Jet for Seajets since 2015.
 Corsica Serena Seconda (1999–2011) as Moby Niki for Moby Lines since 2017.

Routes
Corsica
Nice - Ajaccio 
Nice - Bastia 
Nice - L'Île-Rousse
Nice - Porto-Vecchio  
Toulon - Ajaccio 
Toulon - Bastia 
Toulon - L'Île-Rousse 
Toulon - Porto-Vecchio
Vado Ligure - Bastia  
Vado Ligure - Calvi
Livorno - Bastia
Sardinia
Golfo Aranci - Livorno 
Golfo Aranci - Nice
Golfo Aranci - Toulon
Golfo Aranci - Piombino
Golfo Aranci - Porto Vecchio
Porto Torres - Porto Vecchio
Porto Torres - Toulon
Elba
Piombino - Portoferraio
Bastia - Portoferraio
Sicily
Toulon - Trapani
Nice - Trapani
Balearic Islands
Toulon - Alcudia
Alcudia - Mahon

References

Further reading

External links

 Corsica Ferries official website
  Fakta om Fartyg: Corsica Ferries Sardinia Ferries
 The Yellow Lines
 Simplon Postcards: Corsica Ferries
 Corsica Ferries - The Ferry Site
 Corsica Sardinia Ferries - info from the web
  Press release about Mega Smeralda
Ferries to Corsica Detailed technical specifications of the various ferry vessels, history, deckplans. 

Ferry companies of Italy
Shipping companies of Italy
Transport in Sardinia